Calocalanus pavo is a species of copepod in the family Paracalanidae. The species was previously placed in genus Calanus and family Calocalanidae.

References

Calanoida
Crustaceans described in 1852